Estádio Joaquim Dinis is a multi-use stadium in Luanda, Angola.  It is currently used mostly for football matches and is the home ground of Atlético Sport Aviação.  The stadium holds 10,000 people and was built in 2003.

References 

Sports venues completed in 2003
Football venues in Angola
Estadio Joaquim Dinis
Sport in Luanda